Nenndorf is a Samtgemeinde ("collective municipality") in the district of Schaumburg, in Lower Saxony, Germany. Its seat is in the town Bad Nenndorf.

The Samtgemeinde Nenndorf consists of the following municipalities:
 Bad Nenndorf
 Haste 
 Hohnhorst 
 Suthfeld

Samtgemeinden in Lower Saxony